Sandagdorjiin Erdenebat (born June 17, 1966) is a Mongolian football coach. He was the coach of the Mongolia national football team from 2011 to 2014.

Career

Managerial

References

Living people
Mongolian football managers
Mongolia national football team managers
1966 births